The 2018 Townsville 400 (formally known as 2018 Watpac Townsville 400) was a motor racing event for the Supercars Championship, held on the weekend of 6–8 July 2018. The event was held at Townsville Street Circuit near Townsville, Queensland and consisted of two races, both 200 kilometres in length. It was the eighth event of sixteen in the 2018 Supercars Championship and hosted Races 17 and 18 of the season.

Results

Practice

Race 17

Qualifying

Race 

Notes
 – Garth Tander received a 15-second post-race Time Penalty for Careless Driving, causing an incident along with James Courtney, Chaz Mostert and Anton de Pasquale.

Championship standings after Race 17 

Drivers Championship

Teams Championship

 Note: Only the top five positions are included for both sets of standings.

Race 18

Qualifying 

Notes

– Anton de Pasquale, for causing a Red Flag, had his best lap-time deleted and not permitted to take any further part in qualifying.

Top 10 Shootout

Race 

Notes
 – Jack Le Brocq received a 15-second post-race Time Penalty for Careless Driving, causing contact with Will Davison.

Championship standings after Race 18 

Drivers' Championship standings

Teams Championship

 Note: Only the top five positions are included for both sets of standings.

References

Townsville 400
Townsville 400